Ankireddypalem is a neighbourhood of Guntur in the Indian state of Andhra Pradesh. It was merged in Guntur Municipal Corporation in 2012 and is a part of Guntur West mandal (formerly Guntur mandal).

Demographics 

 Census of India, Ankireddipalem has population of 22256 of which 11464 are males while 10792 are females. Average Sex Ratio of Ankireddipalem village is 941. Population of children with age 0-6 is 2298 which makes up 10.33% of total population of village. Child Sex Ratio for the Ankireddipalem as per census is 974. Literacy rate of Ankireddipalem village was 72.39% com.

See also 
Villages in Guntur mandal

References 

Villages in Guntur district